is a subprefecture of Hokkaido Prefecture, Japan. It was renamed from the earlier Abashiri Subprefecture on April 1, 2010. Abashiri Subprefecture was established in 1897.

Etymology
Abashiri Prefecture was named after the subprefectural office in Abashiri.

Geography

Municipalities

Mergers

External links
  

 

Subprefectures in Hokkaido
2010 establishments in Japan